The Irati Forest, found in the western Pyrenees, covers  of the Navarre region, astride on the Soule (Larrau) and Basse-Navarre (Mendive and Lecumberry) provinces (France) and Navarre (Spain), framed by Mount Okabe (1,466 m) and Pic d'Orhy (2,017 m). It is the second largest and best preserved mixed beech-fir forest in Europe.

Presentation 
Located in a scarcely populated area, it has maintained a wild and mysterious aspect, fueled by many local legends.The access route was only built in 1964.

Toponymy 
Its name comes from the Irati river, which crops up from the meeting of the Urtxuria and Urbeltza.

Flora and Fauna 
For the most part, the Irati Forest shares the flora and fauna of the Pyrenees. Birds found in the area include goldcrests, chaffinches, robins, black woodpeckers, and white-backed woodpeckers. Notable mammals include foxes, wild boar, martens, and roe deer. Smaller mammals include the red vole, gray dormouse, and shrew, as well as the polecat and badger. 
The primary tree species are beech and silver fir.The forest is also home to linden, hazelnut, elm, willow, maple, boxwood, and juniper trees, and rarely yew. Other plants are ferns, lichens, moss, and sloe, and well as rare herbaceous plants such as narcissus and winter bell. Solitary oaks, which used to be more common in the region, are still found in the area.

Gallery

References 

Forests of France
Forests of Spain
Primeval Beech Forests in Europe
Pyrenees conifer and mixed forests